Naldahari is a small village located in the Murshidabad district of the state of West Bengal, India. It is a part of Lalgola Block near the Indo-Bangladesh international border. It is situated about 225 kilometres (140 mi) north of Kolkata, near the head of the Ganges delta. This village is surrounded by Bairbona to the north, Balarampur and Natun Naldahari to the west, Naldahari Godawan More to the south, and farmland to the east. It is the part of Lalgola Gram Panchyat in rural area. Naldahari village has population of 2671 of which are 1362 males while are 1309 females as per Population Census 2011. In this village population of children with age 0-6 is 361 which makes up 13.53% of total population of village. Average Sex Ratio of this village is 961 which is higher than West Bengal state average of 950. Child Sex Ratio this village as per census is 963, higher than West Bengal average of 956. Naldahari village has lower literacy rate compared to West Bengal. In 2011, literacy rate of this village was 72.23% compared to 76.26% of West Bengal. In Naldahari Male literacy stands at 74.85% while female literacy rate was 69.51% .

As per the India and Panchyati Raaj Act, this village is administrated by Gram Panchyat member who is elected representative of village.

Geography 

60% of the land is undeveloped and is used for cultivation, Typical crops are corn, wheat, mustard, jute and vegetables. 5% of the land is ponds used for fish production. The climate is similar to the rest of Gangetic West Bengal. The maximum temperature during the summer is about 45 °C (113 °F); the minimum during the winter is between 8 and 10 °C (46 and 50 °F).

Click here to see on google map

Communication
There is a good communication system in this village. It is less than 1 km away from the terminal railway station Lalgola and 2 km away from Lalgola Bus stand. All types of network connections are available here.

Education
 
There have Bairbona Primary School at the northern side and Naldahari Kodalkati Primary School at the southern side of this village. There are also have some of High school and Madrasah within 2 km of this village. These are 
 Lalgola M N Academy
 Lalgola S.M.G. High school
 Lalgola Rahmatullah High Madrasah 
 Moulana Mumtajuddin Memorial Junior High Madrasah 
 Hosnabad High School
 Al Mahadus Salafi
Lalgola College is only 3 km away from this village.

Professions
Most of the villagers are farmer but there also have some local services and businesses.

Drinking water
The condition of the water of this village is not so pure. So the villagers use drinking water from a treated water project called Naldahari Swajaldhara Prokolpo.

Religion and community

Most of the villagers are Muslim. There have a huge Eidgah (ইদগাহ) in this village. People also from neighboring villages and cities come to pray in this Eidgah in Eid days. There also have three Jame Masjid and some Waktia Masjid in this village.

Villages in Murshidabad district
Villages in Lalgola block